Achchankulam is a small town in Sri Lanka. It is located within Northern Province.

External links

Populated places in Northern Province, Sri Lanka